Krick is a surname. Notable people with the surname include:

 Frank Krick (1910–1982), American sprint canoer
 Irving P. Krick (1906–1996), American meteorologist and inventor
 Jaynie Krick (1929–2014), American baseball pitcher and utility infielder
 Jon Krick (born 1974), American football player
 Perna Krick (1909–1991), American sculptor, painter and teacher
 Peter Krick (born 1944), German figure skater
 Tobias Krick (born 1998), German volleyball player

See also 
 Crick (disambiguation)